Lew Parker (born Austin Lewis Jacobs, October 28, 1910 – October 27, 1972) was an American television, stage and musical theatre actor. His most notable role was as Lew Marie, the arrogant father of Marlo Thomas's character, Ann Marie, on the 1960s television series That Girl.

Early years
Parker was born in Brooklyn and was the son of Lewis Jacobs, who performed in vaudeville.

Acting
Parker appeared on one episode of the television series Gidget in 1966 as Mr. Socrates, the crusty proprietor of The Shaggy Dog, a hamburger restaurant that was a hangout for teenagers. Parker appeared in the television series F Troop in 1966, "The Ballot of Corporal Agarn" as George C Bragan. Parker's character is a mayor candidate in Corporal Agarn's hometown back in New Jersey, and he travels West to get Corporal Agarn's vote since the election was tied and his absentee ballot is needed to break the tie.
His Broadway credits include A Funny Thing Happened on the Way to the Forum (1972), Mr. Wonderful (1956), Ankles Aweigh (1955), The Front Page (1946), Are You With It? (1945), Red, Hot and Blue (1936), Girl Crazy (1930), Heads Up (1929), Spring is Here (1929), and Rainbow (1928).

Personal life/death
In 1955, Parker married actress Betty Kean. They remained together until Parker's death from cancer in New York City on October 27, 1972. Betty Kean died on September 29, 1986, also from cancer.

Filmography

References

External links
 
 

1910 births
1972 deaths
American male musical theatre actors
American male television actors
Male actors from New York City
Deaths from cancer in New York (state)
Musicians from Brooklyn
20th-century American male actors
20th-century American singers
20th-century American male singers